Spodnja Selnica is a settlement on the left bank of the Drava River in the Municipality of Selnica ob Dravi in Slovenia.

References

External links
Spodnja Selnica on Geopedia

Populated places in the Municipality of Selnica ob Dravi